Ali Hussein  (born 1 January 1953) is a former Iraqi football striker who played for Iraq in the 1976 AFC Asian Cup qualification. He played for the national team between 1975 and 1980.

Ali Hussein was topscorer of the Iraqi League in 1979-80 and in 1983-84.

Career statistics

International goals
Scores and results list Iraq's goal tally first.

References

1953 births
Iraqi footballers
Iraq international footballers
Al-Shorta SC players
Living people
Association football forwards